Target of rapamycin complex subunit LST8, also known as mammalian lethal with SEC13 protein 8 (mLST8) or TORC subunit LST8 or G protein beta subunit-like (GβL or Gable), is a protein that in humans is encoded by the MLST8 (MTOR associated protein, LST8 homolog) gene. It is a subunit of both mTORC1 and mTORC2, complexes that regulate cell growth and survival in response to nutrient, energy, redox, and hormonal signals. It is upregulated in several human colon and prostate cancer cell lines and tissues. Knockdown of mLST8 prevented mTORC formation and inhibited tumor growth and invasiveness.

References

Further reading